The West Branch Mattawamkeag River is a  tributary of the Mattawamkeag River in Maine.

Mattawamkeag Lake

Upper Mattawamkeag Lake is at the same level as Mattawamkeag Lake, and boats can easily navigate the short thoroughfare from the south end of Upper Mattawamkeag Lake to the north end of Mattawamkeag Lake. For decades there was a dam at the south end of Mattawamkeag Lake controlling overflow to the West Branch Mattawamkeag River. Water level dropped several feet when the dam was abandoned; and the lake shoreline is rocky where wave action eroded shallow soil. The two lakes provide good habitat for chain pickerel, smallmouth bass and white perch.

See also
List of rivers of Maine

References

Maine Streamflow Data from the USGS
Maine Watershed Data From Environmental Protection Agency

Rivers of Aroostook County, Maine
Rivers of Penobscot County, Maine
Tributaries of the Penobscot River